Bregas (Greek: Βρωμερό or Βρεμερό) is a village in Vlorë County, southwestern Albania. It is part of the municipality Finiq. It is located to the north of Sarandë, northwest of Metoq, Sheleqar and Vrion, southwest of Karanxh and west of Finiq. Bregas  is inhabited solely by Greeks.

In the place situated a christian orthodox church dedicated to St. Paraskevi (Paraskevi of Rome).

References

Populated places in Finiq
Greek communities in Albania